Sir Robert Jardine, 1st Baronet (24 May 1825 – 17 February 1905) was a Scottish businessman and Liberal politician.

Life
Jardine  was born at Edinburgh  the son of David Jardine of Muir House, Lockerbie, Dumfries and his wife Rachel Johnstone. In 1865 he became head of Jardine, Matheson and Co., one of the largest Far East trading houses based in Hong Kong.

At the general election in July 1865, Jardine was elected as Member of Parliament (MP) for  Ashburton in Devon where his uncle William Jardine had been an earlier MP. The Ashburton constituency was abolished at the 1868 general election and he was elected instead at Dumfries Burghs. In 1874 he changed seat again and stood unsuccessfully for Dumfriesshire. However he was elected at the next election in March 1880 and held the seat until he stood down at the 1892 general election. Jardine was created 1st Baronet Jardine, of Castlemilk, Dumfries  in June 1885. He was J.P. and  Deputy Lieutenant of Perthshire. He was also a Fellow of the Royal Geographical Society.
 
Jardine lived at  Castle Milk, Lockerbie. He died aged 79.

Jardine married Margaret Seton Hamilton, daughter of John Buchanan Hamilton, and sister and heiress of John Hamilton-Buchanan, Chief of Clan Buchanan. in April 1867. His wife died a year later.

See also
Family tree of William Jardine (1784-1843)

References

External links 
 

1825 births
1905 deaths
Baronets in the Baronetage of the United Kingdom
Businesspeople from Edinburgh
Deputy Lieutenants of Perthshire
Liberal Party (UK) MPs for English constituencies
Scottish Liberal Party MPs
UK MPs 1865–1868
UK MPs 1868–1874
UK MPs 1880–1885
UK MPs 1885–1886
UK MPs 1886–1892
Liberal Unionist Party MPs for Scottish constituencies
Members of the Parliament of the United Kingdom for Ashburton
19th-century Scottish businesspeople